Nokia Sensor was a software package available on some mobile handsets manufactured by Nokia. It was an application of Bluetooth communication technology. Nokia Sensor allows users to detect other users who are in the vicinity and; to exchange messages and client defined profiles with them. It was released in 2005.

Social Spontaneity 

Nokia Sensor is designed to promote spontaneous communication between users in sociable settings such as bars, nightclubs and railway platforms, business functions etc. Bluetooth wireless technology is used to detect the presence of other suitably enabled mobile phones located within a radius of 10 meters.

User Folio 

On detection, the Nokia Sensor users are alerted and may view each other's personal pages (folios). The content of a folio is defined in advance by the Nokia Sensor user and may contain information such as: a digital photo of the user; a username; a short personal description (job, pastimes).

The folio also contains a 'guestbook' where other users may post and read textual entries.

Free Messaging 

Bluetooth Wireless Technology allows communication between mobile devices without the need for a network operator, therefore the messages are free of charge.

References

External links 
Nokia Sensor (now redirects to Nokia home page)
download Nokia Sensor free (now redirects to Nokia home page)
Archived 2009 Nokia Sensor Page
Archived 2007 Download Page

Nokia services
Bluetooth software
Symbian software